Alonzo Ames Miner (August 17, 1814 – June 14, 1895) was a Universalist minister.  He was the second president of Tufts University.

Origins
Born in Lempster, New Hampshire, he was the second of five children and only son of Benajah Ames and Amanda (Carey) Miner.  His father was a descendant of the colonist Thomas Miner.

He married Maria S. Perley in August 1836.

Career
He taught school in rural Vermont and New Hampshire before being ordained a Universalist minister in 1839. He served as pastor to churches in Methuen, Lowell, and Boston, Massachusetts.

Miner supported many moral and civic causes, at various times being on the Board of Trustees at Tufts, the Board of Overseers at Harvard (appointed 1863), the Massachusetts Board of Education (from 1869, serving 24 years), the Board of Visitors to the Massachusetts normal school.   For 21 years, he was president of the Massachusetts State Temperance Alliance, and he was the Prohibition candidate for Governor of Massachusetts in 1878. One of the founders of Tufts, he rescued the college from near bankruptcy and instituted many new educational programs as president from 1862 to 1875.

Alonzo Ames Miner died at his home in Boston on June 14, 1895.

References

Alonzo Ames Miner, 1862 – Tufts Interactive Timeline

Footnotes

External links
 Records pertaining to marriages and funerals performed and/or attended by Alonzo Ames Miner are in the Harvard Divinity School Library at Harvard Divinity School in Cambridge, Massachusetts.

1814 births
1895 deaths
People from Lempster, New Hampshire
Members of the Universalist Church of America
19th-century Christian universalists
Presidents of Tufts University
Members of the Harvard Board of Overseers